The  was a fleet of the Imperial Japanese Navy established during World War II.

History
The Southeast Area Fleet was an operational command of the Imperial Japanese Navy combining the remaining surface elements of the IJN 8th Fleet with the IJN 11th Air Fleet, the No.5 Special Base Unit. The Southeast Area Fleet was established on  December 24, 1942, during the waning weeks of the Guadalcanal campaign and was headquartered in Rabaul, New Britain. 

In February 1944, after heavy losses in the Solomon Islands campaign, most surviving Japanese surface and naval aircraft forces withdrew from Rabaul to Truk in the Caroline Islands. However, lacking transport, most of the headquarters staff of the Southeast Area Fleet was left abandoned on Rabaul, together with surviving elements of the Imperial Japanese Army IJA 8th Area Army, and was isolated until the end of the war.

Commanders of the IJN Southeast Area Fleet
Commander in chief 

Chief of staff

References

Notes

Books

External links

Fleets of the Imperial Japanese Navy
Military units and formations established in 1942
Military units and formations disestablished in 1945